Donna Louise Tartt (born December 23, 1963) is an American novelist and essayist. Her work has been widely critically-acclaimed, and her novel The Goldfinch won the Pulitzer Prize for Fiction and has been adapted into a film.

Early life 
Tartt was born in Greenwood, Mississippi, in the Mississippi Delta, the elder of two daughters. She was raised in the nearby town of Grenada. Her father, Don Tartt, was a rockabilly musician, turned freeway "service station owner-cum-local politician", while her mother, Taylor, was a secretary. Her parents were avid readers, and her mother would read while driving.

I know a ton of poetry by heart, When I was a little kid, first thing I memorized were really long poems by A. A. Milne ... I also know all these things that I was made to learn. I'm sort of this horrible repository of doggerel verse.

In 1968, aged five, Tartt wrote her first poem.

In 1976, aged thirteen, Tartt was published for the first time when a sonnet was included in The Mississippi Review.

In high school, Tartt was a freshman cheerleader for the basketball team and worked in the public library.

In 1981, Tartt enrolled in the University of Mississippi where her writing caught the attention of Willie Morris while she was a freshman. Finding her in the Holiday Inn bar one evening, Morris said to her, "My name is Willie Morris, and I think you're a genius."

Following a recommendation from Morris, Barry Hannah, then an Ole Miss writer-in-residence, admitted the eighteen-year-old Tartt into his graduate course on the short story. "She was deeply literary", said Hannah. "Just a rare genius, really. A literary star."

In 1982, following the suggestion of Morris and others, she transferred to Bennington College. At Bennington, Tartt studied classics with Claude Fredericks, and also met Bret Easton Ellis, Jonathan Lethem, and Jill Eisenstadt. Tartt graduated in 1986.

Career
Tartt's novels are The Secret History (1992), The Little Friend (2002), and The Goldfinch (2013). Tartt published her first novel, The Secret History in 1992. The book was derived from her time at Bennington College. Amanda Urban was her agent and the novel became a critical and financial success. Vanity Fair called Tartt a precocious literary genius, as she was just 29 years old.

In 2002, Tartt's novel The Little Friend was first published in Dutch, since her books sold more per capita in the Netherlands than elsewhere.

In 2006, Tartt's short story "The Ambush" was included in the Best American Short Stories 2006.

Her 2013 novel The Goldfinch stirred reviewers as to whether it was a literary novel, a controversy possibly based on its best-selling status. The book was adapted for the movie The Goldfinch. Tartt was reportedly paid $3m for the movie rights but parted company with her long-standing agent, Amanda Urban, over the latter's failure to secure Tartt a role in the screenplay writing or wider production. The movie was a critical and commercial failure.

Tartt is a convert to Catholicism and contributed an essay, "The spirit and writing in a secular world", to The Novel, Spirituality and Modern Culture (2000). In her essay Tartt wrote that "faith is vital in the process of making my work and in the reasons I am driven to make it." However, Tartt also warned of the danger of writers who impose their beliefs or convictions on their novels. She wrote that writers should "shy from asserting those convictions directly in their work."

She has spent about ten years writing each of her novels.

Tartt won the WH Smith Literary Award for The Little Friend in 2003 and the Pulitzer Prize for Fiction for The Goldfinch in 2014. She was included in Time magazine's 2014 "100 Most Influential People" list.

Personal life 
In 2013, she claimed that she was not a recluse while stressing the freedoms of shutting the door, closing the curtains and not participating in the life of culture. In 2016, Tartt's cousin, police officer James Lee Tartt, was killed while on duty.

As of 2016, Virginia Living published that Donna Tartt lived with art gallery owner Neal Guma. Both of them studied at Bennington. She and her partner purchased the Charlottesville property back in 1997. Donna Tartt also dedicates her second novel to someone named Neal, although she does not elaborate on his identity.

Awards
 2003 WH Smith Literary Award – The Little Friend
 2003 Orange Prize for Fiction shortlist – The Little Friend
 2013 National Book Critics Circle Award (fiction) shortlist – The Goldfinch
 2014 Baileys Women's Prize for Fiction shortlist – The Goldfinch
 2014 Pulitzer Prize for Fiction – The Goldfinch
 2014 Time 100 Most Influential People
 2014 Andrew Carnegie Medal for Excellence for Fiction – The Goldfinch
 Vanity Fair International Best Dressed List, 2014

Bibliography

Works authored by

Novels
 The Secret History (1992, Alfred A. Knopf)
 The Little Friend (2002, Alfred A. Knopf)
 The Goldfinch (2013, Little, Brown)

Short stories
 "Tam-O'-Shanter", The New Yorker, April 19, 1993, pp. 90–91
 "A Christmas Pageant", Harper's Magazine 287.1723, December 1993, pp. 45–51
 "A Garter Snake", GQ 65.5, May 1995, pp. 89ff
 "The Ambush", The Guardian, June 25, 2005

Nonfiction
 "Sleepytown: A Southern Gothic Childhood, with Codeine", Harper's Magazine 285.1706, July 1992, pp. 60–66
Tartt's great-grandfather gave the five-year-old, for tonsillitis, whiskey, and codeine cough syrup, for two years, when kept home due to tonsillitis, she would read and write poetry.
 "Basketball Season" in The Best American Sports Writing, edited and with an introduction by Frank Deford, Houghton Mifflin, 1993
 "Team Spirit: Memories of Being a Freshman Cheerleader for the Basketball Team", Harper's Magazine 288.1727, April 1994, pp. 37–40
 "My friend, my mentor, my inspiration". in 
 “Afterword” in True Grit, Charles Portis, Overlook Press, New York, 2010, pp. 255-267

Audiobooks read by

Works by Tartt
 The Secret History
 The Little Friend (abridged)

Works by others
 True Grit by Charles Portis (read by and with an afterword by Tartt)
 Winesburg, Ohio by Sherwood Anderson (selections)

References

Sources
 Hargreaves, Tracy (2001). Donna Tartt's "The Secret History". New York and London: Continuum International Publishing Group. .
 Kakutani, Michiko (1992). "Students Indulging in Course of Destruction". The New York Times, September 4, 1992.
 Kaplan, James (September 1992). "Smart Tartt". Vanity Fair.
 McOran-Campbell, Adrian (August 2000). The Secret History.
 Tartt, Donna (2000). "Spanish Grandeur in Mississippi". Oxford American, Fall 2000.
 Yee, Danny (1994). "Studying Ancient Greek Warps the Mind of the Young?"

External links

 Donna Tartt interviewed by Robert Birnbaum at identitytheory.com
 Tartt Interview  with Jill Eisenstadt in Bomb
  video at YouTube
 Donna Tartt and Anne Rice interviewed by Ray Suarez, NPR: Talk of the Nation: (October 30, 1997)
 Donna Tartt interviewed by Lynn Neary, NPR: Talk of the Nation: (November 5, 2002)
 Tartt on reading and her Scottish grandmother  at Maud Newton
 Tartt in Vogue on her teenage worship of Hunter S. Thompson  at Maud Newton
 
 Donna Tartt  interviewed by James Naughtie at BBC Radio 4 – Bookclub (January 5, 2014)

1963 births
20th-century American novelists
21st-century American novelists
American women novelists
Bennington College alumni
Converts to Roman Catholicism
Living people
American psychological fiction writers
People from Greenwood, Mississippi
Novelists from Mississippi
Pulitzer Prize for Fiction winners
20th-century American women writers
21st-century American women writers
People from Grenada, Mississippi
Catholics from Mississippi